These are the Australian number-one albums of 2001, per the ARIA Charts.

See also
2001 in music
List of number-one singles in Australia in 2001

Notes
Number of number one albums: 15
Longest run at number one (during 2001): Moulin Rouge! soundtrack (11 weeks)

References

2001
2001 record charts
2001 in Australian music